t Zand is a hamlet in the Dutch province of Gelderland, in the municipality of Nijmegen.

Populated places in Gelderland
Nijmegen